Department of Housing and Construction' may refer to:

 Department of Housing and Construction (1973–75), an Australian government department
 Department of Housing and Construction (1978–82), an Australian government department
 Department of Housing and Construction (1983–87), an Australian government department